Milwaukee Lutheran High School (MLHS) is a secondary school located in Milwaukee, in the U.S. state of Wisconsin. The school was originally known as Lutheran High School (LHS). LHS was established in 1903, making Milwaukee Lutheran the oldest Lutheran high school in the United States. In the 1950s, doctrinal differences between the two synods operating the school resulted in each church body forming its own school.

MLHS is owned and operated by forty-six Lutheran Church–Missouri Synod (LCMS) congregations, the Lutheran High School Association of Greater Milwaukee (LHSAGM), and accredited by the North Central Association of Colleges and Schools. Milwaukee Lutheran has twice been recognized as a National Exemplary School (Blue Ribbon School) by the U.S. Department of Education. In 1995, the LCMS honored Milwaukee Lutheran as a "Recognized School of Excellence".

History 

In 1903, a group of Lutheran pastors, teachers, and laymen from congregations affiliated with the Wisconsin and Missouri synods started a high school in an unused classroom of Immanuel Lutheran School in Milwaukee with 18 students.) In 1904, it relocated to the former site of the Wisconsin Synod's seminary at 13th and Vine streets. Enrollment increased to 340 in 1929 and led to construction of additional buildings at the site. The Great Depression caused enrollment to decline to 265 in 1938, but with the end of the depression, enrollment steadily increased to 848 in 1948. Plans were initiated to build a larger school at a new site, but doctrinal differences between the two synods resulted in the decision for each synod to build its own separate high school and dissolve the joint operation. The Missouri Synod congregations opened MLHS in September 1955, marking the end of the joint operation of the school. The Wisconsin Synod congregations continued to use the old campus for their school, Wisconsin Lutheran High School, until their new building opened in September 1959.

Twenty-seven Missouri Synod congregations formed "The Lutheran High School Association of Greater Milwaukee" on January 23, 1952. Plans for the new school were prepared by the architectural firm Grassold-Johnson and Associates. The cost was projected to be about $2 million, and pledges for that amount were raised by June 1953. Ground was broken on August 22, 1954, and construction of the main building was sufficiently complete to accept students on September 12, 1955, on which date 806 students and 27 faculty members entered the facility. By May 1956, the music rooms and the gymnasium with its swimming pool had been completed, and the formal dedication occurred during the senior graduation ceremonies on May 6. 

MLHS received accreditation from the North Central Association of Colleges and Schools in 1959. An additional six classrooms and other facilities were added in 1960. Enrollment increased to 1,250 students by 1963, which was over the facility's capacity. The Milwaukee Lutheran Fieldhouse opened on the campus in 1979.

Notable alumni
Fred Kessler, judge and former Wisconsin state legislator
Donald Knuth - author of The Art of Computer Programming
Brian Mueller, president and CEO of Grand Canyon University
Don Pridemore, legislator and politician
John Rhodes, assistant men's basketball coach at Duquesne University
Nick Roach - NFL football player for the Oakland Raiders
Tina Salaks, former ASPCA officer, star of Animal Planets "Animal Precinct" show
Martin J. Schreiber, Governor of Wisconsin, 1977–1979.
Barbara Ulichny - Wisconsin State Senator

References

 The first section of the book (pp. 3–28) is a reprint of  the article of the same name published in two parts in Concordia Historical Institute Quarterly, 33 (4), January 1961, and 34' (1), April 1961.

External links
Milwaukee Lutheran High School official site

High schools in Milwaukee
Private high schools in Wisconsin
Educational institutions established in 1903
Lutheran schools in Wisconsin
1903 establishments in Wisconsin
Secondary schools affiliated with the Lutheran Church–Missouri Synod